The dead man's hand, a legendary "cursed" poker hand usually depicted as consisting of the ace of spades, ace of clubs, eight of spades and eight of clubs with an undefined fifth card, has appeared or been referenced in numerous works of popular culture. It is thought to have been the hand which Old West folk hero, lawman, and gunfighter Wild Bill Hickok was holding when he was shot in the back of the head by Jack McCall on August 2, 1876, in Nuttal & Mann's Saloon at Deadwood, Dakota Territory. It entered into popular poker parlance after the 1926 publication of Frank Wilstach's book Wild Bill Hickok: The Prince of Pistoleers—50 years after Hickok's death.

Written fiction
In the novel Along Came a Spider by James Patterson, Jezzie Flannigan tells the story of how her father won his gun with a hand of aces and eights – she also uses "Aces&Eights" as her computer password.

Dead Man's Hand is the name of the seventh book of the "Wild Cards" series.

In "Batman R.I.P.", while Batman is talking to the Joker in Arkham Asylum, the Joker sends a cryptic message to Batman by dealing himself a "dead man's hand, with a twist." The "twist" is that the eights in the hand are red cards, while the aces remain black. His final card is a joker.

In One Flew Over the Cuckoo's Nest by Ken Kesey, McMurphy has a dead man's hand tattooed on his shoulder, "a poker hand fanned out across his muscle - aces and eights". This foreshadows his fate at the end of the novel.

The title of the fourth novel based on the film Final Destination is titled Dead Man's Hand, and takes place in Las Vegas. Also, a comic book miniseries based on the film used the "dead man's hand" as a means of foreshadowing.

There is a Las Vegas bar called the Nine of Diamonds in the novel Inherent Vice by Thomas Pynchon, "out on Boulder Highway...According to Bigfoot Bjornsen, for whom this piece of western trivia had won him many a bar bet, the nine of diamonds had been the fifth card in Wild Bill Hickok's last poker hand, along with the black aces and eights."

Dead Man's Hand was a story of speculative fiction set in a ghostly Western saloon by Dale T. Phillips, published in Voluted Tales, May 2014.

Film

At least two of John Ford's films feature the aces and eights hand as a foreshadowing of death. In Stagecoach (1939), the hand is held by Luke Plummer (Tom Tyler), soon to be shot by the Ringo Kid (John Wayne). In The Man Who Shot Liberty Valance (1962), Liberty Valance draws the hand just shortly before his death.

In Frontier Marshal (1939), Wyatt Earp, (Randolph Scott) holds the aces and eights during a poker game.

In the 1941 Western The Badlands of Dakota, Wild Bill Hickok, played by Richard Dix, is shown to be holding the aces and eights "dead man's hand" after he has been shot in the back.

In Anthony Mann's film Winchester '73, "Dutch" Henry lays down a full house, aces over eights, stating that he just missed a "dead man's hand."

In Along Came a Spider (2001), aces and eights is the winning hand that gave ownership of a Turkish hand-made shotgun to the father of Agent Flannigan. It later provides a clue about her involvement in the kidnapping plot.

In Joel and Ethan Coen's 2018 Western anthology film The Ballad of Buster Scruggs, the titular character takes over a vacated player's place in a poker game, only to find that he has been dealt the dead man's hand.

TV
In the Maverick season 3 episode "The Cats of Paradise", the dead man's hand is a prominently discussed detail of Wild Bill Hickok's death, with cards making up the hand end up serving as one of the methods Bart Maverick employs to elude the superstitious Sheriff Scratch Madden, the main antagonist of the episode. 

Paul Daniels incorporated the hand into a trick shown during series 6, episode 5 of his magic show, first broadcast 22 September 1984.

On The X-Files episode entitled "Clyde Bruckman's Final Repose", the title character is playing poker with Agent Scully and is seen holding a full house of aces and eights (the ace of hearts being the fifth card).

In "The Assassin" (Season 3 Episode 11) of the television series The Pretender, poker plays a key role, including the appearance of the dead man's hand at the end of the episode.

In a first episode of Quantum Leap ("How the Tess Was Won") a character attempts to rig a game of poker by dealing aces and eights to Sam's love interest. It is referred to as a "dead man's hand" by Al.

In an episode of The Untouchables syndicated TV series (1993-1994), members of an Irish gang are playing poker when they are gunned down by members of an Italian mob.  A short time later, other members of the Irish gang come to investigate the scene of the demise of their unfortunate colleagues.  At one point, the leader of the investigating team examines the poker hand held by one of the deceased and comments matter-of-factly, "Aces and eights".

In Legends of the Hidden Temple, an episode from the first season was told about the legend of Wild Bill Hickok and the Dead Man's Hand.

In "Noosphere Rising" (Season 1 Episode 7) of the television series Touch, a key is given to Jake Bohm (David Mazouz) by Dr. Teller (Danny Glover) with the number 1188 engraved on it.  The number is identified by Martin Bohm (Kiefer Sutherland) as the "dead man's hand", and is part of the number pattern of the fictional Amelia Sequence.

In "The Lightning" (Season 1 Episode 14) of the television series Criminal Minds, Hotch plays cards with a death row inmate, hoping to reveal the location of another victim. Hotch claims to have a pair of aces and a pair of eights, a dead man's hand, which the inmate believes is what he should have. The inmate shows a straight: 7 of spades, 8 of hearts, 9 of spades, 10 of hearts, jack of hearts. Hotch reveals he was hiding another ace, thus beating the inmate.

In "Paradise Lost" (Season 2 Episode 17) of the television series Seal Team, Sonny explains the "dead man's hand" as bad juju. 3 of hearts being the hole card.

In June 2012, Total Nonstop Action Wrestling introduced a faction known as the "Aces & Eights". The faction would use the Dead Man's Hand (black aces, black eights and the fifth card overturned) as a calling card for their attacks.

One edition of the Fox News Channel documentary series Legends and Lies: The Real West presented a biography of Wild Bill Hickok, including – of course – a description of the "Dead Man’s Hand".

The series premiere of the 2023 American murder mystery comedy-drama series Poker Face about a casino worker on the run, written and directed by Rian Johnson, received the title "Dead Man's Hand".

Music
The Ha Ha Tonka song "Dead Man's Hand", the Motörhead songs "Ace of Spades", "Dead man's hand" and the Bob Dylan song "Rambling, Gambling Willie", the Uncle Kracker song "Aces and Eights" and the Bring Me the Horizon song "Alligator Blood" all refer to the legendary poker hand.

The Motörhead song on the B-side of The One to Sing the Blues single, titled Dead Man's Hand, has the lyrics: "You can't beat the devil with a dead man's hand".

The song "Aces & Eights" from the Lita Ford album Stiletto features "The dead man's hand holds aces and eights" in the refrain.

The lyrics "Who's gonna play those eights and aces?" appear in the song "Fire Lake" by Bob Seger.

The lyric "Aces and eights are the fate that you drew" appears in the song "I Am the Storm" by Blue Öyster Cult on their album Mirrors.

The lyric "Can't call a bluff with a dead man's hand" appears in the song "Alligator Blood" by Bring Me The Horizon on their album There Is a Hell Believe Me I've Seen It. There Is a Heaven Let's Keep It a Secret

In the song "Rambling, Gambling Willie" by Bob Dylan, the main character, Will O'Conley, is a successful poker player who loses his life to an angry opponent while holding the dead man's hand. The song contains the lyric, "When Willie’s cards fell on the floor, they were aces backed with eights." Townes van Zandt covers the song on the album Roadsongs. The Lonely Heartstring Band covers the song on their album Deep Waters.

On Michael McDermott's 2000 LP Last Chance Lounge, there is a song entitled "Aces and Eights".  The song expounds on the idea that life can make the writer feel like he is "Looking over my shoulder, holding aces and eights."

Dale Oliver and Serg Salinas produced the song "Dead Man's Hand" as the entrance theme for the Total Nonstop Action Wrestling stable Aces & Eights.

A song titled "Deadman's Hand" appears on the album Untitled #23 by The Church.

In the song "Creepin" by Eric Church the hand is shown during a card game with the 2 of hearts as the kicker.

A song produced by KSHMR titled "Dead Mans Hand" was released on January 26, 2015 under the Spinnin' Records label.

"Dead Man's Hand" is the name of the song that plays during a casino heist in the robbery simulation game 'Payday 2'

"Dead Man's Hand" is a song in Lord Huron's 2015 album, "Strange Trails." The song depicts a dead man on the side of the road who comes to life when someone tries to bury him, and has no immediate reference to Poker, however, there is a Dead Man's Hand of cards seen in the video for Fool For Love, a song from the same album.

Gaming
In the Fallout: New Vegas expansion Dead Money, the player can collect cards that make up the famous Dead Man's Hand (Black aces, black eights, and the Queen of Clubs) from around the ruins of the Sierra Madre casino for an achievement. The developers had purportedly intended to name the expansion itself "Dead Man's Hand" but had to settle for Dead Money due to copyright issues.

The western-themed collectible card game Doomtown makes it the highest rank in the game, with the Jack of diamonds as the fifth card.

In Werewolf: the Apocalypse there is a group of werewolf hunters known as the Dead Man's Hand and use the eponymous cards as their insignia.

In Wing Commander II: Vengeance of the Kilrathi Spirit wins with a full house: aces over eights. Her story becomes more and more tragic until she dies. Similarly, in Wing Commander IV: The Price of Freedom, just before Vagabond dies on an infiltration mission, he loses a critical hand of poker with the same full house.

In the 90th Case of the Facebook game  Criminal Case, the player finds a set of poker cards with 2 black aces and eights, which allows the player to incriminate the killer as someone who plays poker.

In Need For Speed: Carbon the crew Stacked Deck's insignia includes the ace of Spades and an unknown black 8, two of the five cards of the Dead Man's Hand.

In The Walking Dead: A New Frontier a man is shot and killed in a bar shortly after a poker game between the bar owner and his wife, whose hand was both black aces, both black eights and the Jack of Diamonds. The bar owner's wife is also killed later in the story.

In Hearthstone, the warrior has the card "Dead Man's Hand".

In the mobile app Zombies, Run!, a season two Radio Abel caller refers to a dismembered zombie arm as Aces and Eights because it is a dead man's hand.

In Fate/Grand Order, a hand of one face down card with 2 black aces and eights is shown in the noble phantasm animation of Calamity Jane.

In the RPG Serenity, "Aces and Eights" is the name of a spaceship belonging to a rival crew.

The computer game Quest for Glory: So You Want to Be a Hero, features a seedy and dangerous bar that the barkeep will tell you is named the "Aces and Eights Tavern".

In the computer game Chronomaster, the protagonist initially receives a hand of aces and eights when he must join a poker game in a pocket universe engineered as a high-stakes gambling resort; if he chooses to 'stand', he will be killed by a superstitious alien gunslinger when he reveals it.

In the fighting game Guilty Gear Xrd, the character Zato-ONE has an attack named "Dead Man's Hand", associating with the character who is, at that point chronologically, a reanimated corpse.

In the computer game Payday 2, the soundtrack for the "Golden Grin Casino" heist is named "Dead Man’s Hand".

Other
"Aces and Eights" is the title of an episode in the short-lived U.S. radio drama series, Frontier Gentleman. The story includes a fictionalized version of Wild Bill Hickok's last card game as witnessed by J. B. Kendall, the London Times reporter who was the title character. In the story, Kendall is at the table, playing with Hickok and McCall. The story was presented twice during the 41-show run of the CBS series, using different actors (i.e., not a recorded rerun).

The dead man's hand can be seen on an abandoned dust-covered table in the lobby of Walt Disney Studios Park's The Twilight Zone Tower of Terror.

Big Boss Brewing in Raleigh, NC, brews a beer called "Aces and Ates."

Dead Man's Hand is also a beer currently brewed by a small brewery called "Het Nest" in Turnhout, Belgium (World Capital of Playing Cards)

References

Poker hands
Topics in popular culture